Frédéric Bertrand (born 24 July 1971) is a French luger. He competed in the men's singles and doubles events at the 1992 Winter Olympics.

References

1971 births
Living people
French male lugers
Olympic lugers of France
Lugers at the 1992 Winter Olympics
Sportspeople from Hyères